The 1984 Long Beach State 49ers football team represented California State University, Long Beach during the 1984 NCAA Division I-A football season.

The 49er's passing attack was the strength of the 1984 squad.  Led by Junior quarterback Doug Gaynor who passed for 3230 yards (323 per game - third nationally) 16TD's and a strong receiving corps led by wide receivers Charles Lockett (75 catches 1112 yards and 4 TD's), Troy Ory (42-669-3), tight end Greg Locy (31-496-2) and running back Mark Templeton (459 yards rushing and 451 yards receiving).  The defense was led by future third round draft pick John Hendy at cornerback and leading tackler Marc Bevilacqua at middle linebacker.

Long Beach State played a tough non-conference schedule including three Pac-10 schools (Oregon, UCLA and Arizona).  The 49ers played each of those opponents close, losing games by an average of 8 points.  The most exciting victory of the season came in their final game against the San Diego St. Aztecs by a score of 18-17 after converting a 2-point play to seal the win.  

Cal State Long Beach competed in the Pacific Coast Athletic Association. The team was led by first-year head coach Mike Sheppard, and played home games at Veterans Stadium adjacent to the campus of Long Beach City College in Long Beach, California. On the field, they finished the season with a record of four wins and seven losses (4–7, 3–4 PCAA).

After the season was over, it was discovered that the UNLV Rebels had used multiple ineligible players during both the 1983 and 1984 season. As a result, Long Beach's loss to UNLV turns into a forfeit win and their record is adjusted to 5–6, 4–3 PCAA.

Schedule

Roster

Team players in the NFL
The following were selected in the 1985 NFL Draft.

Notes

References

Long Beach State
Long Beach State 49ers football seasons
Long Beach State 49ers football